The 2016–17 Handball Liga Austria is the 56th season of the Handball Liga Austria, Austrian's top-tier handball league. A total of ten teams contest this season's league, which began on 2 September 2016 and is scheduled to conclude in June 2017.

HC Fivers Margareten are the defending champions, having beaten Bregenz Handball 2–0 in the previous season's playoff finals.

Format
The competition format for the 2016–17 season consists of two phases, both played in a home-and-away double round-robin system. The first five teams qualifies for a first play-off round, while the last five plays a play-down round. At the end of this second round, the five teams of the play-off round and the top three teams of the play-down round plays elimination rounds. The last two plays a relegation round.

Teams

The following 10 clubs compete in the Handball Liga Austria during the 2016–17 season. HSG Bärnbach/Köflach was relegated from the previous season and SC Ferlach was promoted from 2015-16 Handball Bundesliga Austria.

First phase

Standings

Results

Second phase

The points obtained during the regular season were halved (and rounded up) before the start of the playoff.

Top play-offs

Bottom play-offs

Play-offs

Relegation 

''HC Bruck won 2-1, Union Juri Leoben is relegated.

References

External links
 Handball Liga Austria

Austria
Handball competitions in Austria
2016 in Austrian sport
2017 in Austrian sport